Everyone's Life (Chacun sa vie et son intime conviction) is a 2017 French comedy film written and directed by Claude Lelouch.

Synopsis
Twelve tales about intimate convictions leading to a thirteenth.

Casting 
The film reunites several celebrated French stars.

 Jean Dujardin : Jean the policeman
 Julie Ferrier : Nathalie Richer / Judith
 Gérard Darmon : : Paul Richer
 Johnny Hallyday : Johnny Hallyday Look-a-like/Himself
 Christopher Lambert : Antoine de Vidas
 Marianne Denicourt: Marianne de Vidas
 Mathilde Seigner : Mathilde
 Stéphane De Groodt: Stéphane
 Nadia Farès: Nadia
 Antoine Duléry:The cop/The mayor
 Béatrice Dalle: Clémentine
 Ramzy Bedia: Tahar
 Déborah François: Jessica
 Chantal Ladesou:The tax auditor
 Liane Foly: Eugénie Flora
 Elsa Zylberstein:The Countess
 Vincent Pérez:The Count
 Rufus:The taxi driver
 Zinedine Soualem: Zinedine
 Vanessa Demouy:Lola
 Éric Dupond-Moretti:The president
 Philippe Lellouche: Philippe
 Francis Huster:The attorney general
 William Leymergie:The Parisian attorney
 Jean-Marie Bigard: The optimist doctor
 Samuel Benchetrit: Samuel
 Isabelle Pasco
 Isabelle de Hertogh:The judge
 Kendji Girac:Kendji
 Dimitri Naiditch
 Laurent Couson
 Solenne Rodier
 Michel Leeb
 Thomas Levet
 Pauline Lefevre
 Angelica Sarre
 David Marouani
 Raphaël Mezrahi

Production 
The film was shot between July and August 2016.

Most of the scenes have been shot in Bourgogne, precisely in Beaune and Dijon.

References

External links

2017 films
2017 comedy films
2010s French-language films
French comedy films
2010s French films